Agrestius (fl. 433–41) was the bishop of Lugo in the Roman province of Gallaecia. He attended the Council of Orange in the year 441. He is usually identified with the author of the Versus Agresti episcopi de fide ad Avitum episcopum, a poem and letter addressed to Avitus, then prefect of Gaul. The chronicler Hydatius, in his account of 433, suggests that Agrestius had Priscillianist leanings.

External links 
Agrestius of Lugo, Eparchius Avitus, and a Curious Fifth-Century Statement of Faith - Journal of Early Christian Studies

References
 Consello da Cultura Galega (ed.), Documentos da Catedral de Lugo, (Santiago de Compostela, 1998)

5th-century Galician bishops
5th-century Latin writers
5th-century Roman poets